Zhang Yiyi (born September 2, 1993 in Beijing) is a Chinese ice dancer. Her partner is Wu Nan.

Programs 
(with Wu)

Competitive highlights 
(with Wu)

References

External links 

 
 
 
 

1993 births
Living people
Chinese female ice dancers
Figure skaters from Beijing
Competitors at the 2013 Winter Universiade
Competitors at the 2011 Winter Universiade